Terki may refer to:

 Terki (fortress), in 16-17th centuries a Russian fortress on the Terek river
 Terki (Iran), an uncommon romanization of Tereki in Iran